The Brandenberger Ache is a river of Bavaria, Germany, and of the Kufstein District, Tyrol, Austria.

It starts as the outflow of the Spitzingsee in southern Bavaria, and flows from North to South to the town of Rattenberg where it merges with the Inn.

References

Rivers of Bavaria
Rivers of Tyrol (state)
Brandenberg Alps
Rivers of Austria
Rivers of Germany
International rivers of Europe